East Ham Grammar School may refer to:
Langdon School, Newham, formerly East Ham Grammar School for Boys
Plashet School, formerly East Ham Grammar School for Girls